Edgardo "Jack" Tanuan (July 23, 1965 – April 4, 2002) was a Filipino professional basketball player in the Philippine Basketball Association.

College / Amateur career
Tanuan played college basketball at Far Eastern University in the UAAP. In the Philippine Amateur Basketball League, Jack saw action for Hope Cigarettes, YCO Shine Masters and MIESCOR. He was part of the Philippine national team that took home the bronze medal during the 1986 Asian Games in Seoul, Korea.

Professional career
He was drafted first overall by newcomer Purefoods Hotdogs in the 1988 PBA draft. He primarily served as backup to Ramon Fernandez and Jerry Codiñera in his rookie year. Under coach Baby Dalupan, Big Jack was a revelation in the 1990 All-Filipino Conference but still could not find his place with Purefoods, averaging only nine minutes per game.

Midway in the first conference of the 1991 PBA season, Tanuan was lured away by Swift Mighty Meaties from Purefoods through the offer sheet. His scoring average soared from 3.8 points per game to 11.6 an outing with Swift. Before the start of the second conference of the 1993 PBA season, Tanuan was traded by Swift to Sta.Lucia Realtors for Zaldy Realubit. 

Jack played back-up to Jun Limpot at Sta.Lucia. He return to Purefoods Hotdogs in 1995 and became a journeyman in the next two seasons, playing for Pepsi/Mobiline and returning as well with Pop Cola. Tanuan was traded in late-1997 to Alaska Milkmen, along with Kenneth Duremdes, and he won his last PBA title with the Milkmen in the 1997 PBA Governors Cup.   

He later moved to the newly formed league MBA via the Negros Slashers.

Illness and death
Tanuan succumbed to a lingering kidney ailment on April 4, 2002. He had been in and out of the hospital for some time and was last confined at the New Era Hospital in Quezon City, battling a kidney disease that ended his career in 2000.

References

1965 births
2002 deaths
Alaska Aces (PBA) players
Asian Games bronze medalists for the Philippines
Asian Games medalists in basketball
Centers (basketball)
Deaths from kidney failure
Magnolia Hotshots players
Medalists at the 1986 Asian Games
Philippine Basketball Association All-Stars
Philippines men's national basketball team players
Filipino men's basketball players
Power forwards (basketball)
Pop Cola Panthers players
Basketball players from Davao City
Sta. Lucia Realtors players
TNT Tropang Giga players
FEU Tamaraws basketball players
Basketball players at the 1986 Asian Games
Magnolia Hotshots draft picks